The 2022 Eschborn–Frankfurt was a road cycling one-day race that took place on 1 May 2022 in the Frankfurt Rhein-Main metro area in southwest Germany. It was the 61st edition of Eschborn–Frankfurt, but only the 59th to be held, and the 19th event of the 2022 UCI World Tour.

The race was won by Sam Bennett in a bunch sprint after the break was caught with 42km to go.

Teams 
In total, 133 riders started the race, of which 116 finished.

The favourites for the race included Jasper Philipsen, John Degenkolb and Alexander Kristoff. 

UCI WorldTeams

 
 
 
 
 
 
 
 
 
 
 

UCI ProTeams

Result

References

External links
  

Eschborn–Frankfurt
Eschborn–Frankfurt
2022
May 2022 sports events in Germany